Korshunovka is a rural locality (a selo) and the administrative center of Korshunovsky Selsoviet of Mikhaylovsky District, Amur Oblast, Russia. The population was 420 as of 2018. There are 7 streets.

Geography 
Korshunovka is located on the right bank of the Zavitaya River, 22 km north of Poyarkovo (the district's administrative centre) by road. Cheremisino is the nearest rural locality.

References 

Rural localities in Mikhaylovsky District, Amur Oblast